Yağmurlu is a village in the Gerger District, Adıyaman Province, Turkey. The village is populated by Kurds of the Kalender tribe and had a population of 281 in 2021.

The village has an Armenian population.

The hamlet of Kumluca is attached to the village.

References

Villages in Gerger District
Kurdish settlements in Adıyaman Province